Goran Alar (born 1 May 1962) is a Croatian retired professional association football striker.

Club career
He played for several Croatian and Austrian football teams. He scored 71 goals for FC Zeltweg. His son is Deni Alar.

Managerial career
After retiring as a player, Alar remained in Austria to coach lower league clubs Zeltweg and Weißkirchen.

References

External links

forum.b92.net
bundesliga.at
novagradiska.com

1962 births
Living people
People from Brod-Posavina County
Association football forwards
Yugoslav footballers
Croatian footballers
NK Marsonia players
NK Osijek players
HNK Hajduk Split players
FK Borac Banja Luka players
DSV Leoben players
Yugoslav First League players
Austrian Football Bundesliga players
Austrian Regionalliga players
Croatian expatriate footballers
Expatriate footballers in Austria
Croatian expatriate sportspeople in Austria
Croatian football managers
Croatian expatriate football managers
Expatriate football managers in Austria